Berești-Bistrița is a commune in Bacău County, Western Moldavia, Romania. It is composed of four villages: Berești-Bistrița, Brad, Climești and Pădureni. It also included Ciumași, Dumbrava, Făgețel and Itești villages until 2005, when they were split off to form Itești Commune.

References

Communes in Bacău County
Localities in Western Moldavia